Wellow is a village on the Isle of Wight. It is located about two miles east of Yarmouth  in the northwest of the island. The name is believed to be of Jutish origin. Recently a proposal to erect a wind farm was rejected after a high-profile protest campaign. Located within Wellow are a small chapel, post office, vineyard and several farms including Mattingley and Manor Farm. The Hamstead trail runs through Wellow.

Transport 
Public transport is provided by buses on Southern Vectis route 7.

Places of interest
The Headquarters of West Wight Alpacas is situated in Wellow.
The Wellow Literary Institute is over 100 years old; originally created as a library for local people it had lain empty for some years in the 1980s until local people heard of plans to demolish it and it is now a community hall with many local events.

Notable people

References

 https://www.wellow-iow.com

Villages on the Isle of Wight